There is no county-wide local education authority in Tyne and Wear, instead education services are provided by the five smaller metropolitan boroughs of Gateshead, Newcastle upon Tyne, North Tyneside, South Tyneside and Sunderland:

List of schools in Gateshead
List of schools in Newcastle Upon Tyne
List of schools in North Tyneside
List of schools in South Tyneside
List of schools in Sunderland